Kjell is a Scandinavian male given name. In Denmark, the cognate is Kjeld or Keld. The name comes from the Old Norse word kętill, which means "kettle" and probably also "helmet" or perhaps "cauldron". Examples of old spellings or forms are Ketill (Old Norse), Kjætil (Old Swedish) and Ketil (Old Danish). An equally likely meaning is a source, a hope that the boy will get ample resources to draw upon later in life.

Kjell has a name day on July 11 in Norway and July 8 in Sweden, and in Denmark with the variant Kjeld.

Prevalence 
In 2007, there were 59,011 men in Sweden with "Kjell" as their first name, making it the 42nd most common masculine name in Sweden. In Swedish and Norwegian it is pronounced with the voiceless alveolo-palatal sibilant fricative [ɕ]. There were 30,809 men in Norway with "Kjell" as their first name. This makes it the 5th most common masculine name in Norway. In Denmark, 8079 men were called "Kjeld" and 5491 "Keld". In Finland, the number of men called Kjell in 2008 was 1405.

The name began to be widely used in the 1600s when it took over from the older name form Kætil or Ketill, which were also precursors of the name Kjetil, and a loan from Latin catillus, which is the diminutive of catinus (= barrel, bowl). Kætil/Ketill was probably one of the most common male names in Old Norse times. In Landnámabók, it is the male name that occurs most often - even more frequently than the most widely used compositions with Tor-. There are 44 found runic inscriptions from the Viking era that contain the name Kætill, which is why it is the 13th most used male name in this material. Five of the inscriptions are found in Denmark and three in Norway, most others have unknown sites. The name was most often written with runes like ᚲᛖᛏᛁᛚ (ketil), ᚲᛁᛏᛁᛚ (kitil) or ᚲᚨᛏᛁᛚ (katil).

In Denmark the name appears in many village (torp) names, so there are nearly 20 places named Kelstrup or Kjelstrup. However, the name does not appear in compositions with -lev, and it can only be explained that it was not used at the time when -lev names were formed. Consequently, we can date the period when Kætil/Ketill was used as a name, at the time between the end of the Migration Period and the beginning of the Viking Age. But the reason that the name gained such tremendous prevalence within a few centuries, we do not know.

The name Kjell is known in Norway from the 1400s. In recent times, the name was widely used in the 1940s and 50s, but is now rarely used for newborn boys.

In Sweden, the name was most popular in the 1940s.

Kjell is today a common name in Norway and Sweden, and Kjeld or Keld is common in Denmark.

The following table provides a detailed overview of the popularity of the male name Kjell and its variants in some of the countries where statistics are available.

Name compositions 
Kjell is found in many name compositions, both of the old date, written in one word, or in new ones, which are written in two words.

Female names: Kjellaug, Kjellrun, Kjellfrid, Audkjell, Kjella, Kjellbjørg
Male names: Torkel, Arnkjell, Askjell, Finnkjell, Grimkjell, Hallkjell, Kjellbjørn, Kjellfred, Torkjell
Newer: Kjell Inge, Kjell Magne, Kjell Einar osv.

Kjell is also present in at least one notable Swedish surname: Kjellberg.

People

A–F
Kjell Almskog (born 1941), Norwegian businessman
Kjell Askildsen (1929–2021), Norwegian writer
Kjell Aukrust (1920–2002), Norwegian poet, author and artist
Kjell Bækkelund (1930–2004), Norwegian classical pianist
Kjell Bäckman (1934–2019), Swedish speed skater
Kjell Berg (born 1962), Norwegian curler
Kjell Bergqvist (born 1953), Swedish actor
Kjell Bjartveit (1927–2011), Norwegian physician and politician
Kjell Bohlin (1928–2011), Norwegian politician
Kjell Bondevik (1901–1983), Norwegian politician and uncle of Kjell Magne
Kjell Magne Bondevik (born 1947), former Norwegian prime minister and nephew of Kjell
Kjell Borgen (1939–1996), Norwegian politician
Kjell Carlström (born 1976), Finnish cyclist
Kjell Colding (1931–2009), Norwegian diplomat and politician
Kjell Dahlin (born 1963), Swedish ice hockey player
Kjell Elvis (born 1968), Norwegian Elvis impersonator
Kjell Engebretsen (born 1941), Norwegian politician
Kjell Eriksson (born 1953), Swedish author
Kjell Espmark (1930–2022), Swedish author
Kjell-Olof Feldt (born 1931), Swedish politician
Kjell Fjalsett (born 1952), Norwegian musician
Kjell Fjørtoft (1930–2010), Norwegian journalist and writer

G–M
Kjell Grede (1936–2017), Swedish film director
Kjell Grengmark (1935–2022), Swedish curler
Kjell Håkonsen (1935–2011), Norwegian harness racing coach
Kjell Hallbing (1934–2004), Norwegian author
Kjell Heggelund (1932–2017), Norwegian literary researcher and lecturer
Kjell Helland (born 1940), Norwegian politician
Kjell Henriksen (1938–1996), Norwegian scientist
Kjell Höglund (born 1945), Swedish singer
Kjell Holler (1925–2000), Norwegian politician
Kjell Holmström (1916–1999), Swedish bobsledder
Kjell Hovda (born 1945), Norwegian biathlete
Kjell Isaksson (born 1948), Swedish pole vault world record holder
Kjell Inge Røkke (born 1958), Norwegian investor
Kjell Jennstig (born 1960), Swedish musician
Kjell Johansson (disambiguation), various people
Kjell Jonevret (born 1962), Swedish football manager and former player
Kjell Kaspersen (born 1939), Norwegian footballer
Kjell Koserius (1943–2002), Swedish Air Force major general
Kjell Knudsen (born 1931), Norwegian politician
Kjell Larsson (1943–2002), Swedish politician
Kjell Eugenio Laugerud García (1930–2009), President of Guatemala
Kjell Lauri, Swedish orienteer
Kjell N. Lindgren (born 1973), US astronaut
Kjell Lönnå (1936–2022), Swedish choir leader and composer

N–Z
Kjell Nilsson (born 1949), Swedish weightlifter and actor
Kjell Nordström (born 1949), Swedish politician
Kjell A. Nordström (born 1958), Swedish economist, writer and public speaker
Kjell Olofsson (born 1965), Swedish footballer
Kjell Opseth (1936–2017), Norwegian politician
Kjell Oscarius (born 1943), Swedish curler
Kjell Qvale (1919–2013), Norwegian-American business executive
Kjell Risvik (1941–2021), Norwegian translator
Kjell Rodian (1942–2007), Danish cyclist
Kjell Roos (born 1956), Swedish musician
Kjell Roos Band, a Swedish band led by Roos
Kjell Samuelsson (born 1958), Swedish professional hockey player
Kjell Bloch Sandved (1922–2015), Norwegian author and lecturer
Kjell Scherpen (born 2000), Dutch footballer
Kjell Schneider (born 1976), German beach volleyball player
Kjell Sjöberg (1937–2013), Swedish ski jumper
Kjell Søbak (born 1957), Norwegian biathlete
Kjell-Erik Ståhl (born 1946), Swedish long-distance runner
Kjell Storelid (born 1970), Norwegian speed skater
Kjell Stormoen (1921–2010), Norwegian actor and theatre director
Kjell Storvik (born 1930), Norwegian economist and former Governor of the Central Bank of Norway
Kjell Sundvall (born 1953), Swedish director
Kjell Westö (born 1961), Finnish author

See also 
Kell
Ketil
Kjeld
Kjetil
HNoMS Kjell

References

External links 
Behind the Name: Kjell
Think Baby Names: Kjell

Norwegian masculine given names
Swedish masculine given names